Stanislav Palkin  (born 4 August 1996) is a Kazakhstani speed skater who competes internationally.
 
He participated at the 2018 Winter Olympics.

References

External links

1996 births
Living people
Kazakhstani male speed skaters 
Olympic speed skaters of Kazakhstan 
Speed skaters at the 2018 Winter Olympics 
Speed skaters at the 2017 Asian Winter Games
Speed skaters at the 2012 Winter Youth Olympics
21st-century Kazakhstani people